Charity Standish is a fictional character on NBC/DirecTV soap opera Passions. She was portrayed by Molly Stanton from July 14, 1999, to July 22, 2004, on contract and then by Kristina Sisco from November 15, 2006, to February 8, 2007, on recurring status. During 2006–2007, a woman named Carla impersonated Charity. Out of costume, Carla was portrayed by Tess Alexandra Parker, while Sisco actually portrayed the costumed Carla in most of her appearances as "Charity". Born to Faith Standish and an unknown man, Charity has the power to channel the forces of goodness. She was not aware of these powers for the first fifteen years of her life, leading a very sheltered life.

Character backstory

Charity was born to an unknown man and Faith Standish, very little is known about her life prior to the beginning of the series. Her mother, Faith, loved her dearly and had fear of evil forces trying to harm her daughter. Charity had powers of goodness which would come into full fruition once she had sex with her true love, Miguel Lopez-Fitzgerald. For this reason Charity never had the chance to go to school and meet friends, since her mother feared for the life of her daughter. Faith was the only one who knew this secret.

Storylines 
Charity meets her lover, Miguel, at a carnival festival held by Grace Bennett, Faith's twin sister. Faith over the years tried to find her twin sister Grace but because of the evil witch Tabitha Lenox causing obstruction she couldn't be able to do so. When, at the carnival, they entered a tent where Tabitha was telling fortunes. When they entered, everything started spinning in mid air but stopped when Faith and Charity left. After the carnival festival, Charity and Faith went home and whilst home, Tabitha tricked her and tried to drag her through the sink into her house but failed. At one stage, Grace and Faith were close to meeting when they were at the same restaurant, but didn't when Tabitha stopped them. After that, Tabitha also tried to disguise her voice as a small child and make Charity fall into the sea but failed when saved by Miguel. When Charity was leaving harmony, Tabitha disguised herself as a taxi driver and tried to get Charity alone, but because of the little angel girl giving a sign to priest church Father Lonigan Miguel came and took Charity home. Shortly afterwards, when Faith was on internet she was chatting to her twin sister Grace. When she was about to show the evil that tried to destroy Grace they were interrupted by Tabitha who changed the picture. When Tabitha found out that Faith and Grace were about meet Tabitha tried to put a stop to it.

Tabitha also disguised herself as a dog and went after Faith. She and Faith had a scuffle which accidentally created a fire. Faith died in the fire but Charity was saved by her lover Miguel. This incident also caused Tabitha to loose her powers to the dark side since she failed to destroy Charity. After that she moved in with Grace and her family. She barely remembers her life before the fire. Charity moving in angered charity's cousin Kay Bennett. She was also in love with Miguel and wanted him. Kay resented Charity since she came in the way of her and Miguel. While living with Grace, Tabitha time after time tried to get rid of charity. She tried killing her by putting her on railway track but was saved by Miguel. On Halloween, she conjured up demons from a fire and tried to destroy Grace and Charity but failed when Father Lonigan came and threw holy water destroying the demons. When Charity arrived at Tabitha's house, she tried to kill her through a fire poker, but failed. She tried burning her at the stake when Charity was doing a school play about witches but was saved by the angel girl and Miguel.

Tabitha also dressed up as Santa and tried electrocuting Charity and Miguel by lighting a Christmas tree but failed. On New Year's Eve she tried to kill Charity by chopping her head off but failed once again. While at New Year's Eve party the little angel girl came to her telling Tabitha that charity might be brought to the dark side due to the death of someone close. This incited Tabitha to try to find a way to make Charity become evil.

Tabitha finds out through an ancient tome that Charity can be brought over to evil if she kills the person she loves, Miguel. Tabitha tries to make Charity kill Miguel by giving her a poisoned petit four for Miguel, but Timmy Lenox (Tabitha's brought to life doll) swaps out the poisoned treat.

Tabitha again tries to make Charity kill Miguel by making Charity give Miguel poison tea, but Charity sees her tea leaves and screams, making Miguel spill his tea. Kay, who also wants to get rid of charity, learns that when Charity is near a certain bird statue she has visions. Kay finds out that Tabitha possessed the bird statue.

Kay finds the bird statue and puts it near Charity, where it causes her to have visions she can't explain. She is eventually put in a psych ward. Tabitha found out about what Kay was doing and went to the hospital. Tabitha then put an act of being crazy and ended up in the psych ward. While being next to the room where Charity was she was overhearing everything. When Charity's situation wasn't getting better, Tabitha overheard the doctor's administrating a drug which if given will make anyone do what another person wants them to do. Tabitha used the opportunity and told Charity to kill Miguel. Simone Russell, Kay's best friend, knew about her schemes and didn't want Charity to suffer anymore.

She removes the bird statue which stops Charity's visions, and Charity is released from the hospital. While at home, still under the drug, she tries to kill Miguel, but is stopped. Charity has continuous visions of Miguel being dead. She breaks up with him for a while, fearing for his life. Miguel decides to go on a ski trip, and she senses danger for him. Tabitha learns of this and tries to make Charity kill Miguel by making her send Miguel into a dangerous place during the ski trip.

She starts an avalanche which almost kills Miguel and Charity. While scheme after scheme failed for Tabitha, the dark forces in her basement were becoming angry at her failure. Charity, while sleepwalking, approached the dark forces. They also tried to kill Charity but failed. Harmony high prom was coming up and Tabitha needed to find a way for charity to become evil. Tabitha found a movie called Carrie and knew what to do. She told Timmy to take the movie and hide it under Kay's bed. Tabitha knew if Kay watched the movie she'd know what to do. Kay got an idea from the movie and decided on prom night to spill fish guts on her.

Tabitha however created an evil pendant which would possess Charity and make her use her powers for evil and kill Miguel. Tabitha gave the pendant to Charity and on the night of the prom Kay spilled fish guts on Charity triggering her powers and making Charity evil. The pendant made her use her powers resulting in the prom boat being destroyed and everyone almost drowning. After the night of the prom Charity, possessed by the pendant, tried to kill Miguel but failed.

She cooks a quiche with poison mushrooms, but Grace gives the wrong mushroom to Miguel resulting in Tabitha eating poison mushroom but survived. Evil Charity told Timmy and Tabitha to remove all the brakes of Miguel's bike and make the bike loose so Miguel would die. This plan failed however, since Theresa Lopez-Fitzgerald took the bike almost killing her. Evil Charity planted snakes and tried to kill Miguel by trapping him in the shed. But Miguel escaped and evil Charity failed. Miguel was planning their high school trip and decided to take everyone to the woods.

Tabitha wanted to stop them but failed. When in the woods Charity went into a trance and tried to burn Tabitha at the stake but was interrupted. Tabitha then made Charity wear the pendant and then told evil Charity to go near the mining shaft and try and push Miguel into it. Miguel was pushed in it. Evil Charity also pushed Kay inside the shaft. Tabitha angry at evil Charity pushed her inside. While inside Kay was trying to pull Miguel away as she was doing so Miguel's foot kicked a box. The box had extreme powers of goodness that could destroy Tabitha and the evil in Charity. While the box was opened, Saint Michael an angel tried to kill Tabitha but failed when Timmy closed the box. Evil Charity tried to kill Miguel while in the mine shaft but failed continuously.

While in the mining shaft Kay and Miguel found the evil witch Hecuba's cave. Hecuba was an evil witch trapped in a cave by Tabitha. While leaving the cave Kay took a diamond not knowing it could break the curse. While in the shaft Miguel and Kay found the box used it and destroyed the pendant on Charity. Tabitha's scheme to destroy Charity once again failed. Kay, still hating Charity for taking Miguel away from her, was still planning on how to get Charity away from Miguel. Kay then made a deal with the evil witch Hecuba and sold her soul. At one stage Kay disguised herself, as Charity when Hecuba cast a spell making her look like Charity, to make love to Miguel but was interrupted when the real Charity showed up. When the real Charity showed up they were both in bed together.

They were about to make love but Tabitha and Timmy stopped them since they knew that if they made love Charity would come into her full powers. Shortly before Christmas Hecuba came and took Kay's soul. Kay now had no choice but to do everything that Hecuba told her. She got a strand of Charity's hair and nail clippings only to cause Hecuba to make ravens attack the Bennett house. She then afterwards made blood drip from the walls and then tried trap Charity in hell. At first Hecuba failed in putting Charity in hell due to Miguel interfering.

But however she succeeded the second time when Miguel left Charity and Kay alone. At first Kay did not tell anyone where Charity was due to Hecuba threatening not to give her soul back however when Hecuba tried to kill Miguel, Kay realized that Hecuba only used her to destroy Charity. After that Kay then decided to tell everyone that Charity was in hell.

After Miguel found out about her he jumped into hell to rescue her. Father Lonigan, Reese and everyone else tried to find a way to save them but were constantly stopped by Hecuba. They threw a ladder of Lucifer into hell but Miguel got knocked out and Hecuba cut the rope trapping Charity in hell. Miguel then tried to rescue Charity by trying to destroy Hecuba but failed when they closed the box not fully destroying Hecuba. This made Tabitha and Timmy trick Hecuba and trap her in a bottle.

Miguel, still trying to think of a way jumped into hell once again. Kay also jumped in only for all of them to realize that they were being dragged to the 10th level of hell. Timmy however having a big crush on Charity wanted to save Charity when evil was starting to destroy the Bennett house. He found out from Tabitha that a demons claw could save Charity.

The little angel girl seeing Timmy's good nature approached him telling him to use it. Timmy then used it resulting in the demons in hell being destroyed and the Bennett house getting sucked in to hell. Tabitha, Timmy, Charity, Miguel and Kay all survived. Hecuba's scheme to get rid of Charity failed just like Tabitha's.

With Grace and Sam's house in ruins, Charity, Grace and Jessica stayed over at Tabitha's house and Kay stayed with Miguel.  Charity afterwards was trying to remember what happened and she started to. She also started feeling that Kay didn't have a soul. She prayed for Kay's soul to return and Kay got her soul back when Timmy heard Charity's prayer. Shortly afterwards Kay decided she wanted to be good. Miguel was planning their high school trip and came across warlock island. As they went, Tabitha and Timmy followed them escaping from an axe murderer named Norma who wanted to kill them. After entering warlock island Tabitha feared for her life that the warlocks would want her since she trapped them on the island.

While there Charity had a vision that the boat that Luis and Sheridan were on was about to explode and that Theresa was about to do something that she would later regret. They couldn't tell them since the boat they had was destroyed by Norma who tried to kill Tabitha and Timmy.  Also while there, the warlocks called Charity to tell her about Tabitha she at first was confused but then thought it was a dream. Miguel, Kay, Simone and Reese went looking for her in the cave. When she was found the warlocks demanded that they wanted someone dead in order for them to come out of the cave. The warlocks took Tabitha, the one they wanted and then they came out only to realize that a freaky hurricane had started. Miguel, Kay, Reese and Simone were washed away by the heavy storm. Charity then saw a tree talking to her telling her to use her powers to save her drowning  friends. The tree also warned that she might loose Miguel if she does save them. She used her powers which not only saved her friends but all the Townsville folks of Harmony.

When returning from warlock island Charity tried to remember the deal she made. She and Grace started realizing that they might have special powers. They then said a prayer which resulted in the resurrection of Sheridan Crane who was dead from the boat explosion. Charity and the others then  heard bad news that Grace and Sam were not legally married. This angered Kay who reverted to her former self. Tabitha knowing this used it to her advantage and then kept a book of spells which Kay found and used a spell to trap Charity in a block of ice. Kay then created a zombie Charity who was in fact a succubus sent from the dark forces in Tabitha's basement.

The dark forces also gave zombie Charity Tabitha's powers. After zombie Charity was created she started to do what Kay told her to do. At times, Charity would, at Kay's telling, flirt with other boys, try and lose her temper and always find a way to hurt Miguel. After a while Kay started to realize that zombie Charity had an agenda of her own and that she wanted to do what she wanted to do.

Kay, at one point, found out from Reese that Someone-after sleeping with a succubus- dies. Kay started to discover that zombie Charity wanted Miguel dead. Kay started regretting what she did and wanted to get rid of zombie Charity. Meanwhile, Tabitha's real life doll Timmy found out that the real Charity can be saved when a device called the Demon's horn is used. Timmy left in search for the demon's horn. Zombie Charity then saw Timmy as a threat and proceeded to try and get rid of him.

Meanwhile, Kay time after time failed in getting rid of zombie Charity. She used the book of spells to try and destroy Zombie Charity but failed when Zombie Charity stopped Kay. She followed zombie Charity to Miguel's house where they were about to make love. She started a fire which burnt and destroyed the entire Lopez-Fitzgerald home. At another stage Kay prayed and asked the angels to destroy her but however Miguel came in and they disappeared. At Another stage they were at a grave yard and zombie Charity tried to make love and kill Miguel but Kay used holy water and stopped her. After Charity's 18 birthday they went to the hotel and stayed but Kay once again stopped them.

Zombie Charity also transformed herself into Julian Crane when Theresa tried to end her life convincing Theresa  she saw Julian in hell. She made Theresa make a deal to get Ethan. When Timmy escaped and ran away in search of the demon's horn, zombie Charity, at times, would send assassins to try and kill Timmy. She sent the bird of mordred to find out where Timmy was but before it could tell zombie Charity anything Tabitha killed it.

She discovered where Timmy was through a crystal ball. She cast the spell of beldacrusta which made animals appear. She however failed since Timmy escaped. She also sent a scarecrow and an iron man but Timmy was saved by Julian, who fled Harmony cause of everyone trying to kill him. She also sent a snake but this time however Timmy was saved by Tabitha.

Timmy then returned to Harmony. By that time zombie Charity stole the good essence of the real Charity and tried to use it but by the time she could zombie Charity started to realize that the real Charity was starting to thaw. Kay then used the essence making her look like Charity then seducing Miguel.

Meanwhile, zombie Charity ran over to the cave, where she was confronted by the real Charity. Timmy also started to use the Demon's horn. Zombie Charity and real Charity got into a scuffle and Timmy got struck by zombie Charity gravely injuring him. The real Charity woke up and used the horn destroying zombie Charity.

Timmy and Charity were rushed to the hospital. In the hospital doctors discovered Timmy was too gravely injured and couldn't make it, He died shortly after. Charity also died resulting in Tabitha getting her full powers. When she received her powers she realized that she signed a form that gave permission to donate Timmy's heart to Charity. At first, when learning this, she tried to put a stop to it but Timmy came and convinced Tabitha not to do so and Tabitha stopped, and Charity survived. After Charity survived, Tabitha's plans towards getting rid of Charity had subsided due to Timmy's heart being in Charity.

After that Charity and Miguel had plans to get married. On their wedding day tragedy struck when Kay found out she was pregnant with Miguel's baby. Charity was upset and called the wedding off. Charity and Miguel were finding it hard to get back together. During that time Kay and Grace were having fights due to Kay accusing her of taking Charity's side all the time.

Kay moves in with Tabitha and works with the dark forces once again. Whilst Kay was living with Tabitha, she tried to use a love potion Tabitha gave her. She went to the cinema where she was with Charity, Miguel, Jessica and Reese. She mixed the love potion in the popcorn which she wanted to give to Miguel but however Reese ended up eating it resulting in Charity and Miguel getting back together and Reese breaking up with Jessica. Shortly afterwards when Sheridan was kidnapped by Beth Wallace's accomplice, Charlie, who was actually Alistair Crane in disguise, Charity had visions that Sheridan was kidnapped and tried to make Beth tell everyone but Beth denied it and no one believed Charity.

A few months later Kay's baby is born. When Kay's baby is born, Charity sees Death coming to take the baby. Death tells her that if she prays the baby will survive, since she has powers of goodness. Charity is confused but eventually prays and saves the baby's life. Death tells Charity that if the baby survives she has to stay away from Miguel. But Charity continues being near Miguel. A few months later Charity has another vision of Sheridan being drowned in water. She tells everyone, and when Luis goes to save her Death returns back to take both Luis and Sheridan. Charity once again saves them. After that, Death wants to take Miguel's baby again. This time ,Charity stayed away from Miguel by flirting with other guys and nearly ends up sleeping with Reese Durkee when Tabitha's daughter Endora casts a spell on them.

Charity's behavior changes as a result of the spell, and she begins to lose her inhibitions. However, Charity still has feelings for Miguel. When Kay and Tabitha are unable to separate them, Endora creates an evil Faith and makes Charity go to Castletown, where her house burnt down in 1999. After this, Tabitha casts a spell that turns Kay into a rabid dog to attack Charity.

Kay, transformed into a dog, goes after Charity to kill her, but the spirit of good Faith appears and gives Miguel a sign to where Charity is. Miguel took a spear and speared Kay, resulting in Kay receiving an infection which leaves her unable to have more children. Miguel and Charity are still unable to break up. Charity suggests leaving town. Tabitha, hearing this, shows Charity all the evil brought to Harmony from the time she arrives. Charity, seeing all the pain she caused, decides to leave Harmony. Miguel goes after her, but returns to Harmony in March 2006, after ending his search for Charity.

In November 2006, Fox Crane, Kay's fiancé at the time, tries to contact her to bring her back to Harmony, but fails. Miguel phones her and asks her to come back, but she refuses, saying that she suffered a great deal in Harmony and has found happiness elsewhere. Shortly after Fox fails to contact Charity, he resorts to hiring an out-of-work actress, disguising her as Charity, and bringing her to Harmony to try and break up Miguel and Kay.

Kay sees Charity and Miguel having sex. When Tabitha hears this, she wonders why she and the dark forces weren't destroyed. She learns that a fake Charity is wandering Harmony. The real Charity, however, returns in January after hearing about the death of her aunt Grace. After the funeral, Charity leaves Harmony again. The real Charity and Miguel never have sex; if they did, their combined forces of good would destroy all evil in Harmony, including Tabitha and Endora. 

When Jessica Bennett leaves her abusive husband Spike Lester, she stays with Charity to have her baby. In the series finale, it is mentioned that Charity is staying in the Bahamas and living as a nun.

Supernatural powers
All the women of the Standish family by blood have supernatural powers; out of all the standish descendants Charity Standish is seemingly the most powerful Standish descendant prophesied to be born with extreme powers of goodness. Some standish women have the power to see visions of the past, the present and the future, while others have an affinity for witchcraft, but none of the Standish descendants' powers are seemingly as potent as Charity's.

Charity's first experience with the supernatural came at the Harmony carnival when she went into the fortune telling tent. Upon returning to Castleton, Charity was rinsing her face when Tabitha reached into her magic bowl and tried to drag her through to Tabitha's living room, but luckily, Charity managed to escape. Charity's powers lay fairly dormant for some time, until Kay begin plotting against her, and bringing the bird statue near her. This prompted psychic visions for Charity, in which she saw Julian and Eve making love. Eve had her committed to the psychiatric ward, and Kay continued to bring the bird statue near her, keeping Charity's visions coming and keeping her locked up. After her release, Charity's powers were quiet for a long time; however, being possessed by a pendant, she used her powers for evil. She did occasionally get twinges that evil was after her (particularly when Kay was around) and saw Kay once in her true demon form, since Kay sold her soul to the evil witch Hecuba. She spent time burning in the fires of hell because of Kay and Hecuba, but escaped and survived. Also whilst on Warlock Island she had a vision of a boat, which Luis and Sheridan were in, that exploded. She also spent almost a year frozen in a block of ice, but eventually the ice melted, due to Timmy finding the demon's horn, which Charity then used to defeat the Zombie Charity that had taken her place. Before Sheridan was kidnapped Charity had visions that she was in trouble, and also sensed that Beth was somehow behind it, but she couldn't prove it. She also had visions of Sheridan being drowned in water which Beth had thrown her in. Charity has never come into her full powers, as they will only take effect when she makes love to her soulmate, Miguel Lopez-Fitzgerald. Charity's powers have primarily manifested themselves as premonitions, which at times come true.

Lookalikes
Charity was plagued by Tabitha and due to evil spells caused by her, Kay, and Hecuba at different points in time Charity's likeness was used by one or the other into creating a doppelgänger of herself. An entity created by Kay from the book of spells known as Zombie Charity plagued Harmony for several months in 2002 later revealing it was a succubus, and  later returning as a ghost. Kay even used Charity's essence to disguise herself as Charity in order to make love her boyfriend Miguel. At one point, Fox hired a lookalike to impersonate Charity as well using a mask, but the ruse eventually fell apart.

See also
 Bennett and Standish families

External links

American female characters in television
Fictional Christian nuns
Fictional witches
Passions characters
Television characters introduced in 1999